This is a list of all military vessels designated under the Protection of Military Remains Act 1986. 
All of the wrecks are designated under the 2019 order (which came into force on 2 September 2019) since this revoked the previous order. Information about the wrecks can generally be found in the announcement for the year that they designated (2002, 2006, 2008, 2009, 2017 or 2019).

Other wrecks with protected status 
The primary reason for designation under this Act is to protect as a 'war grave' the last resting place of UK servicemen (or other nationals).
The Protection of Wrecks Act 1973 provides for wrecks to be designated for their historical, archaeological or artistic value or because they are dangerous.
A small number of wrecks are given protection under the Ancient Monuments and Archaeological Areas Act 1979.

List of Protected Places designated under the Act
Protected places are designated by name and can be designated even if the exact location is not known. Diving on these sites is permitted, but it is an offence to penetrate the wreck, interfere with, disturb or remove anything from the site unless licensed to do so by the Ministry of Defence.

List of Controlled Sites designated under the Act
Controlled sites are specifically designated by location and no operations, such as diving, excavation or salvage, may be carried out without a license from the Ministry of Defence

References